The Demand side is a term used in economics to refer to a number of things:

 Demand, an element of a supply and demand partial equilibrium diagram in microeconomics
 Aggregate demand, in macroeconomics